Epimartyria pardella is a species of moth belonging to the Micropterigidae family. It was described by Walsingham, Lord Thomas de Grey, in 1880. Its wingspan is 10–11 mm with a metallic brown forewing featuring three distinctive gold spots. Adults are on wing from early May to mid July and are day active. The larvae feed on liverworts, including Conocephalum conicum and Pellia species and take about two years to fully develop. 

The species is found in southern Oregon and north-western California.

References

External links
mothphotographersgroup

Micropterigidae
Moths described in 1880
Taxa named by Thomas de Grey, 6th Baron Walsingham